Leslie William Galvin (30 April 1903 – 1 July 1966) was an Australian politician. He was a Labor Party member of the Victorian Legislative Assembly for Bendigo from 1945 to 1955 when he was defeated at the state election, then regained the seat in 1958 until 1964.

Galvin was born in the Sydney suburb of Woollahra, and was educated at Petersham Commercial School until his family moved to Melbourne, where he continued his education at Scotch College. He became involved in the trade union movement while apprenticed as a fitter and turner with the Victorian Railways in Bendigo, and served on the local Trades Hall councils and branches of the Australian Railways Union.

In 1939, Galvin was elected to the Bendigo City Council, and was Mayor of Bendigo from 1944 to 1945. He then considered a tilt at federal politics, but was convinced by his friend, John Cain, to nominate for the 1945 Bendigo state by-election triggered by the death of Arthur Cook. Duly elected, Galvin was made President of the Board of Land and Works, Commissioner of Crown Lands and Survey and Minister for Water Supply in the Second Cain Ministry after Labor won the 1945 election. Following the defeat of the Cain government in 1947, Galvin was voted deputy leader of the Labor Party in Victoria.

When Labor re-gained power in 1952, Galvin became Chief Secretary and Deputy Premier. He was acting Premier in 1953, while Cain attended the coronation of Queen Elizabeth II. During the Australian Labor Party split of 1955, Galvin remained loyal to Cain and the traditional party, although his support wavered to Bill Barry when he heard that Cain preferred Ernie Shepherd to be deputy leader. At the 1955 election, Galvin was defeated in Bendigo by the Liberal and Country candidate, John Stanistreet, by just twelve votes. His defeat removed him from the running to lead the party, and Shepherd was elected leader when Cain died in 1957. Although Galvin regained Bendigo in 1958, he was once again denied the leadership when he was injured a car accident days before the leadership ballot, which saw Clive Stoneham voted leader.

Galvin retired from parliament in 1964 due to ill health. He died two years later in Bendigo, suffering from cirrhosis.

References

1903 births
1966 deaths
Members of the Victorian Legislative Assembly
Mayors of places in Victoria (Australia)
Victoria (Australia) local councillors
Australian trade unionists
Australian people in rail transport
People educated at Scotch College, Melbourne
Deaths from cirrhosis
Australian Labor Party members of the Parliament of Victoria
Politicians from Sydney
20th-century Australian politicians
Alcohol-related deaths in Australia